OpenKBM is a set of computer software for systems management of applications that use knowledge management techniques (the KBM in OpenKBM stands for Knowledge Based Management).

Originally conceived of and developed as a next generation replacement for Gensym's G2 real-time expert system development platform, the OpenKBM technology and its first layered product, NetCure, were acquired by Rocket Software in 2001 from Gensym Corporation.  OpenKBM is used by Rocket and, via OEM agreements, by partners such as IBM and Avaya as the basis for management software applications.

Components 
OpenKBM provides:

 Object model for representing the systems to be managed
 Object-oriented hierarchy of monitoring information types such as events, fault, and statistics
 Data acquisition, signal processing, and event processing engines
 Forward chaining event correlation engine
 Knowledge Based Management Language (KBML) for codifying event correlation rules, and signal and event processing logic
 Frameworks for both thick client and web-based graphical user interfaces

Products

 Avaya Visualization Performance & Fault Manager (part of UCM suite)
 NetExpert Neon
 NETMG GoldenTHREAD
 Rocket NetCure Enterprise]
 Rocket NetCure Audit
 Rocket NetCure Discovery
 Mainstar MXI G2 for z/OS

References 

 http://www.rocketsoftware.com/networks/enterprise-management/openkbm/overview. Rocket OpenKBM
 https://books.google.com/books?id=FxwEAAAAMBAJ&pg=PA44&lpg=PA44&dq=rocket+gensym&source=bl&ots=GEhj41kl22&sig=etIbF55VYSjsKyqV-oUy8cUfvdU&hl=en&ei=m-BbTfi_D4T58Abv_8SADg&sa=X&oi=book_result&ct=result&resnum=10&ved=0CFcQ6AEwCTgK#v=onepage&q&f=false.  NetworkWorld May 28, 2001
 http://support.avaya.com/css/P8/documents/100107393. Nortel announces UCM release

Expert systems
Network management